Aalaya Sikharam is a 1983 Telugu film directed by Kodi Ramakrishna. The film stars Chiranjeevi and Sumalatha in the lead roles.

Plot 
Chiranjeevi plays a horse-cab driver role in this movie. He is the second son of Gollapudi, who is jobless and sells everything possible for gambling. Ranganath is Chiru's elder brother — the only educated person in the family. Chiru works hard to see his brother succeed after completing school, but Ranganath ditches his family and joins Satyanarayana's factory, who eventually woos him to become his son-in-law. Sumalatha sells flowers and is in love with Chiru. She stands by Chiru when he faces troubles, both from his brother and father. After Ranganath left them, Chiru takes up the responsibility of his family, and tries to get his sister's marital life settled. But Ranganath refuses to recognize Chiru's family in society, and publicly insults them. Satyanarayana uses Ranganath to solve his professional problems, and then frames him from in a murder case. Despite Ranganath's hatred towards his family, Chiru helps him out of the case and exposes Satyanarayana's evil intentions. Ranganath and Gollapudi realize their responsibilities and a happy family reunion takes place.

Cast 

Chiranjeevi
Gollapudi maruti rao
Sumalatha
Mucherla Aruna
Rallapalli
Kaikala Satyanarayana
P.L.Narayana

External links

1983 films
Films directed by Kodi Ramakrishna
Films scored by Satyam (composer)
1980s Telugu-language films